The year 548 BC was a year of the pre-Julian Roman calendar. In the Roman Empire, it was known as year 206 Ab urbe condita. The denomination 548 BC for this year has been used since the early medieval period, when the Anno Domini calendar era became the prevalent method in Europe for naming years.

Events
Diognetus of Croton wins the stadion race at the Olympic Games.
The Temple of Apollo at Delphi, Greece is damaged in a fire. The Alcmaeonids rebuild the structure.

Deaths
 Duke Zhuang II, ruler of the Chinese state of Qi
 Megakles II (born 595 BC), Athenian statesman, son of Alkmaion II, grandson of Megakles I, and husband to Agariste of Sicyon
 Thales of Miletus (born c. 626 BC), pre-Socratic Greek philosopher and the first natural philosopher who belonged to the Milesian school along with Anaximander and Anaximenes

References